
Year 777 (DCCLXXVII) was a common year starting on Wednesday   of the Julian calendar. The denomination 777 for this year has been used since the early medieval period, when the Anno Domini calendar era became the prevalent method in Europe for naming years.

Events 
 By place 

 Europe 
 Saxon Wars: King Charlemagne spends Easter in Nijmegen, and leads a large Frankish army to Paderborn, where a general assembly of Carolingian and Saxon leaders had been summoned. Saxon lands are integrated into the Frankish Kingdom, and divided into missionary parishes. Duke Widukind and his followers flee to King Sigfred of Denmark, seeking refuge and support.
 Abbasid–Carolingian alliance: Charlemagne receives a request for support from pro-Abbasid rulers in the eastern thughur, or military frontier zone of the Emirate of Córdoba. Several powerful officials and noblemen in northeastern Iberia, such as the governors of Barcelona and Zaragoza, seek to rise up against the Umayyad emir Abd al-Rahman I.

 Africa 
 Abd al-Rahman ibn Rustam is recognized as imam of the Ibadis, in Maghreb (western North Africa).

 By topic 
 Religion 
 Duke Tassilo III of Bavaria founds Kremsmünster Abbey (modern Austria). During this period, the Tassilo Chalice is possibly donated by Luitpirga, wife of Tassilo (approximate date).

Births 
date unknown 
 Heungdeok, king of Silla (Korea) (d. 836)
 Ishaq ibn Rahwayh, Muslim imam (or 778)
 Masawaiyh, Assyrian physician (d. 857)

Deaths 
date unknown
 Feardomhnach, abbot of Tuam (Ireland)
 Flaithrí mac Domnaill, king of Connacht (Ireland) 
 Fujiwara no Kiyonari, Japanese nobleman (b. 716)
 Fujiwara no Yoshitsugu, Japanese statesman (b. 716)
 Ibrāhīm al-Fazārī, Muslim astronomer
 Waermund, bishop of Worcester
probable
 Telerig, ruler (khagan) of Bulgaria
 Walpurga, Anglo-Saxon missionary (or 779)

References